The 2023 Frankfurt Galaxy season is the third season of the new Frankfurt Galaxy team in the European League of Football. In the 2023 season the Galaxy plays in the Western Conference.

Preseason
The 2021 champion announced the resigning of starting quarterback Jakeb Sullivan. Shortly after, the franchise re-signed local talent Lorenz Regler for the 2023 season.

Regular season

Standings

Roster

Transactions
From Raiders Tirol: Tony Anderson

Staff

Notes

References 

Frankfurt Galaxy (ELF)
Seasons in German sport
Frankfurt Galaxy
Frankfurt Galaxy